Julien Benhaim-Casanova (born 25 October 1996) is a French professional footballer who plays as a midfielder for Championnat National club Stade Briochin.

Career
Benhaim made one Coupe de France appearance for Bastia, while they were in Ligue 1 in 2014–15.

In 2020, Benhaim signed for Club San José in Bolivia.

In June 2021, Benhaim signed with Championnat National side Stade Briochin.

References

External links
 

1996 births
Living people
French footballers
SC Bastia players
UE Engordany players
Marignane Gignac Côte Bleue FC players
AS Furiani-Agliani players
Club San José players
AS Béziers (2007) players
Stade Briochin players
Championnat National players
Championnat National 2 players
Championnat National 3 players
Expatriate footballers in Andorra
Expatriate footballers in Bolivia
French expatriate sportspeople in Andorra
French expatriate sportspeople in Bolivia
Association football midfielders

French expatriate footballers
Sportspeople from Bastia
Footballers from Corsica